The Chatham Cup, is a knockout competition in New Zealand football, organised by New Zealand Football. It is the oldest existing football competition in New Zealand, having commenced in the 1923 season. The tournament is open to all clubs in New Zealand football league system, although a club may only enter one team into the tournament. Secondary schools are also eligible to enter. The competition culminates at the end of the league season (usually in September) with the Chatham Cup Final.

The vast majority of Chatham Cup Final matches have been in Wellington: most of these were played at the Basin Reserve. The other venues used for the final on a regular basis are Athletic Park and Newton Park, both in Wellington, North Harbour Stadium and Newmarket Park in Auckland and McLean Park in Napier.

As of 2021, the record for the most wins is held by University-Mount Wellington with 7 victories. The cup has been won by the same team in two or more consecutive years on eight occasions, and three teams have won 3 consecutive finals: Waterside, Christchurch United and Waitakere City. The cup is currently held by Auckland City, who defeated Eastern Suburbs in the 2022 final.

Results

Results by team
Teams shown in italics are no longer in existence.

See also 
 List of association football competitions

Notes

References

 Finals
Sport in New Zealand